

Directors 
 Richard Courant (1935–1958)
 James J. Stoker (1958–1966)
 Kurt O. Friedrichs (1966–1967)
 Jürgen Moser (1967–1970)
 Louis Nirenberg (1970–1972)
 Peter Lax (1972–1980)
 S. R. Srinivasa Varadhan (1980–1984)
 Cathleen Synge Morawetz (1984–1988)
 Henry McKean (1988–1994)
 David W. McLaughlin (1994–2002)
 Charles M. Newman (2002–2006)
 Leslie Greengard (2006–2011)
 Gerard Ben Arous (2011–present)

Notable Courant faculty 

This is a small selection of Courant's famous faculty over the years and a few of their distinctions:

 Gérard Ben Arous, Davidson Prize
 Marsha Berger, NASA Software of the Year, National Academy of Engineering, National Academy of Sciences
 Fedor Bogomolov
 Richard Bonneau
 Luis Caffarelli, Wolf Prize
 Sylvain Cappell, Guggenheim Fellowship
 Sourav Chatterjee, Davidson Prize
 Jeff Cheeger, Veblen Prize, Guggenheim Fellowship, Max Planck Research Prize
 Steven Childress, Guggenheim Fellowship, American Physical Society Fellow
 Demetrios Christodoulou, 1993 MacArthur Fellow
 Richard J. Cole, Guggenheim Fellowship
 Martin Davis, Steele Prize
 Percy Deift, George Pólya Prize, Guggenheim Fellowship, National Academy of Sciences, American Academy of Arts and Science
 Kurt O. Friedrichs, 1976 National Medal of Science
 Paul Garabedian, NAS Prize in Applied Mathematics, National Academy of Sciences, American Academy of Arts and Science
 Leslie Greengard, Steele Prize, Packard Foundation Fellowship, NSF Presidential Young Investigator, National Academy of Engineering, National Academy of Sciences
 Mikhail Gromov, 2009 Abel Prize, Wolf Prize, Steele Prize, Kyoto Prize, Balzan Prize,
 Larry Guth
 Helmut Hofer, Ostrowski Prize, National Academy of Sciences
 Fritz John, 1984 MacArthur Fellow
 Joseph B. Keller,  1988 National Medal of Science, Wolf Prize
 Michel Kervaire
 Subhash Khot, 2010 Alan T. Waterman Award
 Morris Kline
 Peter Lax, Abel Prize winner, 1986 National Medal of Science, Steele Prize, Wolf Prize, Norbert Wiener Prize
 Lin Fanghua, Bôcher Memorial Prize, American Academy of Arts and Science
 Wilhelm Magnus
 Andrew Majda, NAS Prize in Applied Mathematics, John von Neumann Prize (SIAM)
 Henry McKean, National Academy of Science, American Academy of Arts and Science
 David W. McLaughlin, National Academy of Science, American Academy of Arts and Science
 Bud Mishra, Association for Computing Machinery Fellow
 Cathleen Synge Morawetz, 1998 National Medal of Science, Steele Prize, Birkhoff Prize, Noether Lecturer, National Academy of Sciences, American Academy of Arts and Science
 Jürgen Moser, Wolf Prize, James Craig Watson Medal
 Assaf Naor, European Mathematical Society Prize, Packard Fellowship, Salem Prize, Bôcher Memorial Prize, Blavatnik Award
 Charles Newman, National Academy of Science, American Academy of Arts and Science
 Louis Nirenberg, 1995 Crafoord Prize, National Medal of Science, Steele Prize, Bôcher Memorial Prize, Chern Medal, National Academy of Sciences, American Academy of Arts and Science
 Laxmi Parida, IBM Master Inventor and ISCB Fellow
 Charles S. Peskin, 1983 MacArthur Fellow, Birkhoff Prize, National Medal of Science
 Amir Pnueli, National Academy of Engineering, Israel Prize, Turing Award, Association for Computing Machinery Fellow
 Peter Sarnak
 Jack Schwartz, developed the programming language SETL at NYU
 Michael J. Shelley, American Physical Society Fellow, François Naftali Frenkiel Award (APS)
 Victor Shoup, with Ronald Cramer developed the Cramer–Shoup cryptosystem
 Jonathan Sondow
 Joel Spencer
 K. R. Sreenivasan
 S. R. Srinivasa Varadhan, Abel Prize winner, Steele Prize, National Academy of Sciences, American Academy of Arts and Science, Fellow of the Royal Society, National Medal of Science
 Daniel Stein, Fellow of the American Physical Society, Fellow of the American Association for the Advancement of Science
 Demetri Terzopoulos , Guggenheim Fellow, IEEE and ACM Fellow, Academy Award for Technical Achievement, IEEE Computer Pioneer Award
 Akshay Venkatesh, Salem Prize, Packard Fellowship
 Olof B. Widlund
 Margaret H. Wright, National Academy of Science, National Academy of Engineering
 Lai-Sang Young, Satter Prize, Guggenheim Fellowship, American Academy of Arts and Science
Theodore Rappaport, founder of NYU Wireless, Fellow of the National Academy of Inventors

Notable Courant alumni 

This is a small selection of Courant's alumni:

 Anjelina Belakovskaia (Masters in Finance 2001), U.S. Women's Chess Champion
 Anita Borg (PhD 1981), founding director of the Institute for Women and Technology (IWT)
 Ivan Corwin (PhD 2011), professor at Columbia University
 Charles Epstein (PhD 1983), hyperbolic geometry
 Corwin Hansch (PhD 1944), statistics
 Joseph B. Keller, 1988 National Medal of Science, Wolf Prize
 Barbara Keyfitz (PhD 1970), Director of the Fields Institute
 Sergiu Klainerman (PhD 1978), Professor at Princeton
 Morris Kline (PhD 1936), NYU professor (1938–1975)
 David Korn (PhD 1969), creator of the KornShell
 Martin Kruskal (PhD 1952), National Medal of Science, co-discoverer of solitons and the inverse scattering method for solving KdV
 Peter Lax (PhD 1949), recipient of the Abel Prize, National Medal of Science, Steele Prize, Wolf Prize, Norbert Wiener Prize
 Chen Li-an (PhD 1968), Taiwanese Minister of Defence
 Louis Nirenberg (PhD 1949), Crafoord Prize, Bôcher Memorial Prize, National Medal of Science, Chern Medal
 Brian J. McCartin (PhD 1981), 2010 Chauvenet Prize
 Cathleen Morawetz (PhD 1950), National Medal of Science, Birkhoff Prize, Lifetime Achievement Award from the AMS, professor emeritus at Courant Institute
 Stanley Osher (PhD 1966), Level Set method, professor at University of California, Los Angeles
 George C. Papanicolaou (PhD 1969), professor at Stanford University
 Susan Mary Puglia (BA in Computer Science and Math), Vice President at IBM
 Gary Robinson, software engineer noted for anti-spam algorithms
 Shmuel Weinberger (PhD 1982), topology and geometry; Professor at University of Chicago
 Jacob Wolfowitz (PhD 1942)
 Wojciech Zaremba (PhD 2016), co-founder of OpenAI

See also
List of New York University people

References 

Lists of people by university or college in New York City

New York University-related lists